The 14319/14320 Indore–Bareilly Weekly Express is an express train service which runs between Indore, the largest city and commercial capital of central Indian state of Madhya Pradesh and Bareilly, the important city of the Uttar Pradesh.

Coach composition

The train consists of 23 coaches:

 1 AC II Tier
 5 AC III Tier
 12 Sleeper class
 3 General Unreserved
 2 Seating cum Luggage Rake

Service

14319/ Indore–Bareilly Weekly Express has an average speed of 45 km/hr and covers 1038 km in 23 hrs 10 mins.
14320/ Bareilly–Indore Weekly Express has an average speed of 43 km/hr and covers 1038 km in 23 hrs 55 mins.

Route and halts 

The important halts of the train are:

Schedule

Rake sharing

The train shares its rake with 14321/14322 Ala Hazrat Express (via Bhildi) and 14311/14312 Ala Hazrat Express (via Ahmedabad).

Direction reversal

Train reverses its direction 1 time at:

Traction

Both trains are hauled by a Diesel Loco Shed, Izzatnagar-based WDM-3A or WDM-3D or WDP-4D diesel locomotive.

See also 
 
 Bareilly Junction railway station
 Lokmanya Tilak Terminus–Bareilly Weekly Express

References 

Transport in Indore
Trains from Bareilly
Rail transport in Madhya Pradesh
Express trains in India
Railway services introduced in 2014